Shinka may refer to: 

 Shinka, a village in Pakistan
 Mazda RX-8 Shinka, a special edition in the North American market

See also 
 Kani Shinka, a village in Iran
 Shinka-ron, a DVD box-set from Akinori Nakagawa
 Shinca (disambiguation)
 Chinka (disambiguation)